Ryszard Bogdan Majer (born 4 August 1971 in Częstochowa) – is a Polish politician, academic teacher, local official.

Biography 
He graduated from the Jan Długosz University in Częstochowa.

He is a member of Law and Justice and Solidarity. From 2006 to 2009 he was a councilor and vice-chairman of the Silesian Regional Assembly. He was a vice-president of Częstochowa (2009-2010). In 2010 he became a councilor of Częstochowa City Council. In 2014 he was again elected as a councilor of the Silesian Regional Assembly.

In the parliamentary election in 2015 he was elected from 68th district with the support of Law and Justice to the Senate. He won the parliamentary mandate in 68th district again in parliamentary election in 2019, winning about 48 percent of the votes.

References 

1971 births
Jan Długosz University alumni
Law and Justice politicians
Living people
Members of the Senate of Poland 2015–2019
Members of the Senate of Poland 2019–2023
Polish city councillors
Recipients of the Bronze Cross of Merit (Poland)